The Marty and Miller Show is a radio and television sports talk show hosted by Marty Tirrell and Ken Miller based in Des Moines, Iowa. It is broadcast on 1700AM The Champ KBGG and 1490AM The Jock KXLQ and televised across the Midwest on Mediacom 22 -HD 822.

The three-hour program debuted in 2015. It is broadcast weekdays live 3-6PM Central.

The show is streamed on MartyandMiller.com and is available in podcast form on iTunes.

Marty & Miller is also available via SportsSpotlight.com...

American sports radio programs